Sen kväll med Luuk (Late night with Luuk) was one of Sweden's and TV4's most popular talk shows ever and started airing in 1996. Kristian Luuk's show had ratings around 1.5 million viewers every week. Kristian had many celebrity guests like Cher, Whitney Houston, Madonna, Kylie Minogue, Janet Jackson and Mariah Carey. In 2004, after 8 years of broadcasting the show, Kristian Luuk decided to quit the talk show and started his new project God Afton Sverige, which turned out to be a failure.

There are no plans of reviving the show from TV4 at this moment.

References

External links
List of all guests

TV4 (Sweden) original programming
Swedish television talk shows